Slide On Over Here is the fourth studio album by American country music artist Steve Azar. It was released on August 4, 2009, via Ride Records. The album includes the singles "Moo La Moo", which charted in the Top 40 on the Billboard Hot Country Songs chart and "Sunshine (Everybody Needs a Little)", which peaked at number 27.

The album debuted and peaked at number 57 on the U.S. Billboard Top Country Albums, becoming Azar's first charting album on that chart since Waitin' on Joe in 2002.

Critical reception
Giving the album four stars out of five, Country Weekly critic Chris Neal called it a "pitch-perfect progression" from Azar's last album (2008's Indianola), saying that it retained Azar's Mississippi-based musical influences "while expanding its musical scope."

Track listing

Personnel
As listed in liner notes.
Steve Azar – lead vocals, background vocals, electric guitar, acoustic guitar, piano, keyboards, shaker, hand claps
Gary Burnette – electric guitar
Tony Colton – piano, organ
Tom D'Angelo – bass guitar
Eric Darken – drums
Mark Easterling – acoustic guitar, electric guitar
Jim Femino – background vocals
Trez Gregory – background vocals
John Henshey – horns
James House – acoustic guitar, shaker, background vocals
Josh Kelley – acoustic guitar, background vocals
A.J. Masters – bass guitar
Chris McHugh – drums
Gary Morse – pedal steel guitar, Weissenborn
Russ Pahl – pedal steel guitar, lap steel guitar
Rich Redmond – drums
Dana Robbins – horns
Chris Tuttle – piano, organ
Quentin Ware – horns
Jason Young – harmonica, percussion, congas, background vocals

Tracks 1–4, 8, 9, 12, 13 produced by Steve Azar and Justin Niebank; all other tracks produced by Steve Azar.

Chart performance

Album

References

2009 albums
Steve Azar albums